Olga Voshchakina (born 27 January 1961) is a Soviet fencer. She competed in the women's foil events at the 1988 and 1992 Summer Olympics.

References

External links
 

1961 births
Living people
Russian female foil fencers
Soviet female foil fencers
Olympic fencers of the Soviet Union
Olympic fencers of the Unified Team
Fencers at the 1988 Summer Olympics
Fencers at the 1992 Summer Olympics
Universiade medalists in fencing
Sportspeople from Novosibirsk
Universiade silver medalists for the Soviet Union
Medalists at the 1985 Summer Universiade